The Centre for Tax Policy and Administration  is part of the Secretariat of the Organisation for Economic Co-operation and Development in France. Grace Perez-Navarro serves as the director of the Centre.

Among its initiative have been :

 Base erosion and profit shifting (OECD project)
 Guidance on Fiscal federalism
 Criticism of transparency of tax havens such as Monaco and Panama
 Greater Exchange of information between tax authorities
 The Convention on Mutual Administrative Assistance in Tax Matters

The Centre released the report Harmful Tax Competition: An Emerging Global Issue.

References

External links
 

OECD
International taxation
Tax organizations